Survival & Resistance is the third solo album by British producer Adrian Sherwood. It was released on 21 August 2012 on On-U Sound Records.

Track listing

Personnel 

Musicians
Kerry Ava – violin, cello
Skip McDonald – guitar, piano, keyboards
George Oban – bass guitar
Adrian Sherwood – sampler, effects, programming, arrangements, producer, mixing
Additional musicians
Adamski – synthesizer (1, 5)
Guilherme Arantes – piano (4)
Crucial Tony – guitar (1, 10)
Anneli Drecker – vocals (7)
Ghetto Priest – vocals (2)
Alan Glen – harp (10)
Jazzwad – drum programming (9)
Dr. Timothy Leary – spoken word (3)
Wayne Maxted – drum programming (4, 8)
Simone Soul – percussion (4, 8)

Technical personnel
Rika Ishii – design
Kevin Metcalfe – mastering
Dave McEwen – co-producer, mixing

Release history

References

External links 
 

2012 albums
Adrian Sherwood albums
Albums produced by Adrian Sherwood
On-U Sound Records albums